New Zealand won 20 medals at the 1980 Summer Paralympics: 7 golds, 6 silver and 7 bronze medals.

See also
 New Zealand at the Paralympics

References

External links
International Paralympic Committee
Paralympics New Zealand

Nations at the 1980 Summer Paralympics
1980
Paralympics